Jan Larsson (born September 4, 1965) is a retired Swedish professional ice hockey player who is currently an assistant coach for Brynäs IF. Larsson played 680 Elitserien games during his playing career, spending most of that time (16 seasons) with Brynäs.

Awards and accolades
 1999–2000 Håkan Loob Trophy
 1998–99 Guldhjälmen
 Swedish national champion in 1993 and 1999 with Brynäs IF

Career statistics

Regular season and playoffs

International

References

External links

1965 births
Living people
Brynäs IF players
Swedish ice hockey centres